Hanna Skandera is a former Secretary of Education of New Mexico. She served in the position from 2010 to 2017. She was not confirmed by the state Senate until February 16, 2015, after holding the title "secretary designate" for over four years. Prior to moving to New Mexico, she served as Deputy Education Commissioner of Florida

After President-elect Donald Trump announced his intention to nominate Betsy DeVos as United States Secretary of Education in November 2016, Skandera was mentioned as a possible candidate for deputy secretary or under secretary in the Department of Education.

On June 8, 2017, Skandera announced that she was stepping down as New Mexico Secretary of Education, effective June 20.

References

External links
 Official Website
 Twitter

Living people
21st-century American politicians
State cabinet secretaries of New Mexico
New Mexico Republicans
Year of birth missing (living people)